Giselle Isabella P. Norman is an English fashion model.

Early life 
Norman is the oldest of four girls. She grew up in Petworth, West Sussex.

Career 

After struggling academically, Norman decided to drop out of Bryanston School and model full time. She was discovered by Storm Management at a restaurant. She debuted as an exclusive at JW Anderson's A/W 2018 show, selected by casting director Ashley Brokaw to open the show. She walked for Dior, Chloé, Paco Rabanne, Loewe, Miu Miu, Sonia Rykiel, Valentino, and Louis Vuitton. In the A/W 2019 season, she walked in 38 shows for brands including Chanel, Fendi, Versace, Stella McCartney, Michael Kors, Lanvin, and Victoria Beckham. Norman has appeared in American Vogue, Vogue Italia, Vogue Japan, British Vogue, WSJ, Dazed, and i-D.

, Norman is ranked on the "Top 50" list by models.com. Models.com also chose her as a "Top Newcomer" for the S/S 2019 season. Vogue chose her as one of the "Top 14 Models of the F/W 2019 season".

References 

2001 births
Living people
English female models
People from Petworth
Models from London
People educated at Bryanston School
People with dyslexia
Women Management models
Ford Models models